The 2010–11 EHF Women's Cup Winners' Cup was the thirty-fifth edition of the tournament that is organized by the European Handball Federation for the domestic cup winners on the continent. ŽRK Budućnost Podgorica were the title holders, however, as Montenegrin champions they entered the EHF Champions League this season. Ferencvárosi TC won the trophy for the second time in the club's history after beating CB Mar Alicante 57–52 on aggregate in the finals.

Overview

Team allocation

CL Relegated from the EHF Champions League

Round and draw dates
All draws held at the European Handball Federation headquarters in Vienna, Austria.

Tournament

Round 2

|}

First leg

Second leg

Round 3

|}

First leg

Second leg

Last 16

|}

First leg

Second leg

Quarterfinals

|}

First leg

Second leg

Semifinals

|}

First leg

Second leg

Finals

|}

First leg

Second leg

Top scorers

References

External links 
 

2011
2010 in women's handball
2011 in women's handball